Mohsen Khalili (born February 14, 1981) is a retired Iranian football forward.

Club career

Saipa
He Played for Saipa for several seasons, helping the team win the Iran Professional League in the 2006/07 season, scoring 8 goals. He was the team's second topscorer after Ali Daei.

Persepolis
In June 2007 he signed a 2-year deal with Iranian giants Persepolis for a reported fee of $300,000. He scored a spectacular curler against Bargh Shiraz. This was followed by a stunning volley in the last match of the league against Sepahan, a game which ended 2-1 thanks to Sepehr Heidari's extra time goal.

During the 2007/08 season Khalili became the top goalscorer by scoring 18 goals during the Persian Gulf Cup which persepolis won at the end. Hadi Asghari from Rah Ahan also scored 18 goals and finished in the top as well but because Asghari had scored a few goals from the penalty spot, people and critics called Khalili the real top goalscorer. Khalili was the only player in Persepolis who played in all of the regular season games and he became really close with the fans especially after each goal he scored, he would be the only one to be celebrating with the fans.

On July 2, 2008 he renewed his contract with Persepolis despite having better financial offers from UAE clubs.
Because of the injury during the training camp of Team Melli in August 2008 he was out for 9 months. During the 2008/09 season, Khalili made his return on March 3, 2009 in a 2-1 home defeat against Moghavemat but he scored his first goal since his return against Paykan on April 12. He also scored in Persepolis's last group stage match in the AFC Champions League against Al Shabab to take Persepolis through to the Round of 16 as the top team.
The next season, he was benched in first half of the season by then coach Zlatko Kranjcar but in the second half of the season with changes in the coaching staff, new coach Ali Daei who had been his coach at Saipa F.C. trusted him and he was a regular in the team. He scored the last goal in the Hazfi Cup final against Gostaresh Foolad F.C. thus also scoring the last goal of the season. In the summer break in an interview Ali Daei said that he did not need him anymore and a few days later the club announced that they could not reach an agreement with the player and were not renewing his contract.

After Persepolis
He joined Steel Azin in Summer 2010 and stayed there for a season but again injuries did not allow him to become a regular player and after the relegation of the team his contract was automatically canceled. He joined Mes Kerman in January 2012 and halfway through the season after he missed the first half because of the injury he had and was one of the regular players of the team. He joined Saba in Summer 2012. He was released by Saba on December 2012 after the appointment of Samad Marfavi as the new coach.

Club career statistics

 Assist Goals

International career
In June 2007, Mohsen Khalili was called up to join the Iran national football team in the 2007 West Asian Football Federation Championship but as he was injured he did not make an appearance.

In January 2008 he made his debut for Iran in a friendly match against Qatar. In March 2008 when Ali Daei became Iran's coach, Khalili was called up to the national team again for a friendly Match against Bahrain and a World Cup qualifying match against Kuwait.
Khalili scored his 1st international goal on the 14 June 2008 when he made the final score 2-0 against Syria in Iran's 2010 World Cup Qualification match.
He was invited again by Afshin Ghotbi in January 2010 and played in 2011 AFC Asian Cup qualification.

International goals 
Scores and results list Iran's goal tally first.

He has scored against Esteghlal 6 times in 5 matches in a row.

Honours
Iran's Premier Football League
Winner: 2
2006/07 with Saipa
2007/08 with Persepolis
Hazfi Cup
Winner: 1
2009/10 with Persepolis

Individual
Iran's Premier Football League top goalscorer: 1
2007/08 with Persepolis, 18 goals shared with Hadi Asghari
Football Iran News & Events
Player of the year (2007/08), Persepolis
Striker of the year (2007/08), Persepolis
Iran Football Federation Award
Goalscorer of the year (2007/08), Persepolis, shared with Hadi Asghari

References

External links

Iranian footballers
Iran international footballers
Association football forwards
Persian Gulf Pro League players
Saipa F.C. players
Pas players
Sanat Mes Kerman F.C. players
Persepolis F.C. players
People from Tehran
1981 births
Living people